This is a list of racetracks which have hosted a GT World Challenge America race between 1990 and 2022. This list includes SRO America's GT4 America, TC America and GT America series. Several nations have hosted a race, including the United States, Canada, Mexico, and Puerto Rico. Canadian Tire Motorsport Park has hosted the series in 28 of its 30 seasons, the most of any track. The 8 tracks which are hosting a race in the 2023 season, are listed in bold.

See also
 List of IMSA SportsCar Championship circuits
 List of World Sportscar Championship circuits
 List of Can-Am Challenge Cup circuits
 List of IMSA GT Championship circuits
 List of American Le Mans Series circuits

References

Circuits
Pirelli World Challenge
GT World Challenge America